A, B, C... Manhattan is a 1997 American drama film directed by Amir Naderi and starring Lucy Knight. It was screened in the Un Certain Regard section at the 1997 Cannes Film Festival.

Cast
 Lucy Knight as Colleen
 Erin Norris as Kacey
 Sara Paull as Kate
 Maisy Hughes as Stella
 Nikolai Voloshuk as Stevie
 Merritt Nelson as Janet (as Rebecca Nelson)
 Arnie Charnik as Louis
 Stella Rose as Roz
 Ezra Buzzington as Zach (as Jonathan Harris)
 Brendan Sexton III as Bob

References

External links

1997 films
1997 drama films
1997 independent films
Films directed by Amir Naderi
American independent films
American drama films
1990s English-language films
1990s American films
English-language drama films